Valet (also Romanized as Vālet) is a village in Kelardasht-e Gharbi Rural District, Kelardasht District, Chalus County, Mazandaran Province, Iran. At the 2006 census, its population was 96, in 31 families.

References 

Populated places in Chalus County